The Lublin R-VIII was a Polish bomber, reconnaissance aircraft and seaplane designed in the late 1920s by the Plage i Laśkiewicz factory in Lublin. It was the first in-house design of Plage i Laśkiewicz, and the first with the name Lublin.

Development
The aircraft was designed in answer to a request of the Polish Air Force for a heavy single-engine reconnaissance and bomber airplane. Work started in 1926. The main designer was Jerzy Rudlicki (the letter "R" in the designation for his name). The prototype R-VIII was flown in March |1928. It was fitted with a  Farman 12We W-12 engine, but in tests proved to be underpowered. In July 1928 the second prototype was completed with a more powerful  Lorraine-Dietrich 18Kd engine. In August 1928 it flew in the Aviation Contest of the Little Entente and Poland.

In 1929, the Polish Aviation Department of War Ministry ordered four aircraft with the designation R-VIIIa. They were built in early 1930. One was fitted with a Lorraine-Dietrich engine, the rest with the  Hispano-Suiza 12Lb. More were not ordered, as the aircraft had good performance when carrying only a limited payload and fuel reserve (which limited its range), when it carried more bombs, or maximum fuel load, its performance was poor.

The prototypes and serial production aircraft were used by the Polish Air Force only for a short time. In August–September 1930, three R-VIIIa flew in the Aviation Contest of the Little Entente and Poland, taking a mediocre 7th and 9th places. In service, both Lorraine-Dietrich-powered aircraft crashed - in 1930 and 1931.

In 1932, the existing R-VIIIs were converted to floatplanes for the Polish Navy. The first prototype was fitted with Lorraine-Dietrich engine and was designated R-VIII bis (Aircraft number 801). Two aircraft with Hispano-Suiza engines were designated R-VIII ter (numbers 802 and 803). The fourth aircraft was broken into spare parts. The maximum speed of the floatplane variant was lowered to 200 km/h. They were also called R-VIII/hydro.

A six-seat passenger aircraft, the R-IX, was developed in 1929, based on the R-VIII, but it remained a prototype.

Operational service
The R-VIII floatplanes were used by the Polish Naval Aviation Squadron (MDLot) in Puck from 1933, in a long reconnaissance escadre. From 1938, they were assigned to training, and were scheduled for withdrawal from service. They survived until the Invasion of Poland in 1939, but the R-VIII bis had its engine removed by then. After the first German air raid on naval aviation base in Puck on September 1, all floatplanes were evacuated from Puck to the Hel Peninsula (the bulk were Lublin R-XIIIs). Since R-VIIIs were quite obsolete by then, they were not used in combat. They were anchored on Puck Bay by Chalupy on Hel Peninsula, near the base of the peninsula, where they were bombed by Stukas on September 8.

Description
Wooden construction biplane, conventional in layout. A fuselage was rectangular in cross-section, plywood covered. Wings canvas and plywood covered, upper wing of greater span. Crew of two, sitting in tandem in an open cockpit, with twin controls (three crewmen could be carried as well, with radio operator). Conventional fixed landing gear, with a rear skid, or two Short floats.

Powerplants
W-12 Farman12We , fitted to the first prototype, but proved under-powered.
W-18 Lorraine-Dietrich 18Kd  power,  take-off power, water-cooled (second prototype, one serial R-VIIIa, R-VIIIbis)
V-12 Hispano-Suiza 12Lb  power,  take-off power, water-cooled (three serial R-VIIIa, R-VIIIter)

Operators

 Polish Air Force
 Polish Navy

Specifications (R-VIIIa, Lorraine-Dietrich 18Kd engine)

See also

References

Andrzej Glass: "Polskie konstrukcje lotnicze 1893-1939" (Polish aviation constructions 1893-1939), WKiŁ, Warsaw 1977 (no ISBN)

External links

 Photos and drawings at Ugolok Neba
youtube.com/watch?v=OSp0ruNFY_w&t=564s

1920s Polish bomber aircraft
1920s Polish military reconnaissance aircraft
World War II Polish aircraft
R08
Biplanes
Single-engined tractor aircraft
Aircraft first flown in 1928